The 2000–01 season was the 98th season in the existence of Boavista F.C. and the club's 32nd consecutive season in the top flight of Portuguese football. Boavista won its first, and to date only, league championship.

In addition to the domestic league, Boavista participated in this season's editions of the Taça de Portugal and the UEFA Cup.

Players

First-team squad

Transfers

In

Out

Pre-season friendlies

Competitions

Overall record

Primeira Liga

League table

Results summary

Results by round

Matches

Taça de Portugal

UEFA Cup

Qualifying round

First round

Second round

Statistics

Goalscorers
Includes all competitive matches. The list is sorted alphabetically by surname when total goals are equal.

Hat-tricks

(H) – Home ; (A) – Away

Clean sheets
The list is sorted by shirt number when total clean sheets are equal. Numbers in parentheses represent games where both goalkeepers participated and both kept a clean sheet; the number in parentheses is awarded to the goalkeeper who was substituted on, whilst a full clean sheet is awarded to the goalkeeper who was on the field at the start of play.

Notes

Awards

CNID Footballer of the Year

Record Player of the Year

Portuguese Golden Ball

References

Boavista F.C. seasons
Boavista F.C.
Portuguese football championship-winning seasons